Geoffrey "Geoff" Oakes (born 20 May 1938) is an English former professional rugby league footballer who played in the 1950s and 1960s.

Background
Geoff Oakes was born in Belle Vue, Wakefield, West Riding of Yorkshire, England, he worked at Walton Colliery .

Playing career

Championship final appearances
Geoff Oakes played  in Wakefield Trinity's 3–27 defeat by Wigan in the Championship Final during the 1959–60 season at Odsal Stadium, Bradford on Saturday 21 May 1960, and played  in the 5–14 defeat by Huddersfield in the Championship Final during the 1961–62 season at Headingley Stadium at Odsal Stadium, Bradford on Saturday 19 May 1962.

Challenge Cup Final appearances
Geoff Oakes played  in Wakefield Trinity's 38–5 victory over Hull F.C. in the 1959–60 Challenge Cup Final during the 1959–60 season at Wembley Stadium, London on Saturday 14 May 1960, and played  in the 12–6 victory over Huddersfield in the 1961–62 Challenge Cup Final during the 1961–62 season at Wembley Stadium, London on Saturday 12 May 1962.

County Cup Final appearances
Geoff Oakes played  in Wakefield Trinity's 16–10 victory over Huddersfield in the 1960–61 Yorkshire County Cup Final during the 1960–61 season at Headingley Rugby Stadium, Leeds on Saturday 29 October 1960, and played  in Warrington's 16–5 victory over Rochdale Hornets in the 1965–66 Lancashire County Cup Final during the 1965–66 season at Knowsley Road, St. Helens on Friday 29 October 1965.

Club career
Geoffrey Oakes, Reg Parker and Harold Poynton made their début for Wakefield Trinity in the 17–12 victory over St. Helens at Belle Vue, Wakefield on Saturday 1 February 1958, he made his début for Warrington on Saturday 21 November 1964, and played his last game for Warrington on Wednesday 28 September 1966.

Biography
Played soccer – goalkeeper at Thornes House Grammar School. Started playing rugby at 16.

In 1955 played two matches for Yorkshire Amateurs U-18 against Lancashire and Cumberland whilst with Trinity Juniors and signed for Wakefield Trinity in 1956 and remained with Trinity until 1964. Geoff made his first team appearance in 1958 against St Helens together with Harold Poynton and Reg Parker. Played in two winning Wembley finals, two championship finals and one Yorkshire Cup. Chosen as "shadow " for Great Britain.

Signed for Warrington in 1964 and whilst there won a Lancashire Cup winners medal. In 1967 returned to Wakefield and retired in 1968 after breaking a leg against St Helens, missing "water splash" final, having played in all previous rounds.

Geoff's other sporting interest is golf, and he is a former member, and past captain City of Wakefield Golf Club. Served on Leeds and District Golf Union executive committee. Played in many pro-ams around the world, winning 25 events including Monaco, Trinidad and Tobago, Acapulco and Biarritz. Professionals played alongside included Mike Slater (pro at Warringon), Hedley Muscroft, Ronan Rafferty, Paul Carrigill, Bill Ferguson and local professional Adrian Ambler. Best handicap 4.

Also became interested in Horse Riding and took part in one day hunter trials, winning at Heath, Wakefield and hunted several times with Rockwood and Badsworth hunts.

When owning the Quarry Inn, Horbury he improved his cooking skills and continues to do so in retirement!

Family
Geoff has two adult children, and two grandchildren.

References

External links
Search for "Oakes" at rugbyleagueproject.org
Rugby League Cup Final 1960
Wakefield Win Cup 1962
Statistics at wolvesplayers.thisiswarrington.co.uk

1938 births
Living people
English rugby league players
Rugby league players from Wakefield
Rugby league hookers
Wakefield Trinity players
Warrington Wolves players